[[File:Freeciv-2.1.8 technology tree (cropped).png|thumb|upright=1.5|Part of Freecivs technology tree, showing complex dependencies between technologies. For example, astronomy can be reached by first researching ceremonial burial and then mysticism, or by researching masonry followed by mathematics]]

In strategy games, a technology, tech, or research tree is a hierarchical visual representation of the possible sequences of upgrades a player can unlock (most typically representing the research progress of a given faction). Because these trees are technically directed and acyclic, they can more accurately be described as a technology directed acyclic graph'''. The diagram is tree-shaped in the sense that it branches between each 'level', allowing the player to choose one sequence or another. Each level is called a tier and is often used to describe the technological strength of a player. Typically, at the beginning of a session of a strategy game, a player will start at tier 1, and will only have a few options for technologies to research. Each technology that a player researches will open up one or more new options, but may or may not, depending on the computer game, close off the paths to other options. The tech tree is the representation of all possible paths of research a player can take, up to the culmination of said sequence.

A player who is engaged in research activities is said to be "teching up", "going up the tech tree", or "moving up the tech tree". Analysis of a tech tree can lead players to memorize and use specific build orders.

Types
Classic research
The Classic tech tree is the one where extensive research into new technologies must be conducted parallel to the progression of a game. Some real-time strategy (RTS) games as well as most turn-based strategy (TBS) games employ this type of tech tree. In these games, players typically have a 'command center', 'unit-training-facility' and 'research facility' at their disposal from the start, allowing them to both start research into more advanced technologies, or engaging in combat with enemies using the basic units (Warzone 2100, Mega Lo Mania, Master of Orion series, Civilization series, Space Empires series).

Allocation
In some games, the requirement of an actual research facility is absent. In this case players can allocate research points, or in-game resources to purchase new technologies. In some games the allocation yields direct results, meaning that procuring the new technology isn't paired with allotted time for the research of said technology to complete.

Building-based
In most RTS games the technology tree consists of buildings which must be built in a specific sequence, which in turn unlocks new technologies. These newly unlocked technologies can be more advanced units, upgrades for research or more advanced buildings. (StarCraft, Command & Conquer series.)

Prerequisites for technology advances
In most types of strategy games, the player needs particular buildings in order to research specific technologies or build specific advanced units (StarCraft, Total Annihilation), while in other games upgrades/technologies are unlocked through research of their parent technology research (Warzone 2100). In many TBS games the prerequisite is one or more lower-level technologies, with no dependency on specific buildings (Master of Orion series, Civilization series, Space Empires series).Master of Orion (1993), the Galactic Civilizations series and Sword of the Stars have no research buildings; players simply allocate some of each colony's output to research (see game manuals). In the Civilization series (1991 onwards) and Master of Orion II (1996) one can do research without buildings, but it's much faster when supported by the right buildings (see game manuals). In the Space Empires series (1993 onwards) and in Ascendancy (1995) research can only be done via buildings, but these can research any technology (see game manuals).
Most strategy games however use both systems. both requiring dedicated buildings and in advanced cases pre requisite technology, sometimes culminating in a game ending super-weapon of some kind.

Complexity

The structures of tech trees vary quite widely. In the simplest cases (e.g. Master of Orion) there are several completely separate research areas and one could research all the way up to the highest level in one area without researching other areas (although this would often be far from ideal). In more complex cases (e.g. Civilization) every technology above the starting level has more than one prerequisite and one has to research most of the lower-level technologies in order to research any of the top-level technologies. And there are many possibilities between these two variants, for example in Space Empires researching to a specified level in one field may enable the player both to research to a higher level in that field and to start research in a new field which was previously not available.

Major 4X games like Civilization and Master of Orion have a much larger technology tree than most other strategy games; as an extreme example, Space Empires III has over 200 technologies.In Warcraft III one can reach the highest level of one branch of the technology tree in five steps; Master of Orion (original version) has 10 levels per subject, and 2 to 5 technologies per level; the Civilization IV technology tree requires nearly 60 steps to reach the end (see game manuals).

Availability of technologies

Some RTSs make different techs available to different races or cultures (especially StarCraft; but many RTSs have special units or buildings for different cultures, e.g. Age of Empires expansion pack and later versions, Red Alert 2). Most TBSs make all technologies available to all cultures (e.g. Civilization). Master of Orion (original version) is a complex special case in this respect: the full tree is the same for all; but in each game each player gets a subset of the full tech tree that depends on which race was selected.

Balance between civilian and military techs
In many RTS games tech advances are almost exclusively military (e.g. StarCraft). But in most TBS and some RTS games the research and production costs of top-end military techs are so high that you have to build up your economy and your research productivity first (RTS – Age of Empires and Empire Earth, where one of the most significant costs is going up an epoch; TBS – the Civilization series and Master of Orion series).

What happens after researching everything 
In many games there's nothing useful to do and the player may scrap research centers to save maintenance costs and/or devote the resources to something else (Space Empires series).

In later installments of the Civilization series the last technology (called "future tech") represents an amalgamation of all possible future discoveries and can be researched repeatedly. In Civilization V, it increases a player's score, while in Civilization IV it raises the health and the happiness in the empire. Note that to reach the last technology in Civilization V, all spaceship technologies required to win must also have been discovered, so the game will likely be nearing its conclusion.

In the Galactic Civilizations series the final technology solves the nature of existence, and is victory.

In the Master of Orion series more advanced research reduces the size and cost of spaceship components, and "hyper-advanced" research in areas which have military applications therefore enables players to build more high-tech weapons into a given ship size and at lower production cost.

In Rise of Nations, the final four technologies result in such an advantage that the game will likely end quickly. Also, the "knowledge" resource needed to research is also used late in the game to produce cruise missiles and nuclear weapons.

 History 
Typically the board game Civilization by Francis Tresham (1980) is given the credit of introducing a technology tree. Sid Meier’s Civilization (1991) is considered as an iconic computer turn-based strategy game for using them. Since Civilization, technology trees have been used in various digital games. Likewise, the first creation of a technology tree as a mechanism refers to Civilization.

The arcade shoot 'em up Gradius used a power-up system functionally identical to a tech tree in 1985.

Tech trees started showing up in turn-based strategy games in the early 1990s. The 1991 video game Mega Lo Mania had a tech tree with a system of research levels/epochs that allowed the deployment of better units and defences and is considered to be the first game to combine a technology tree into a Real-time strategy'' game.

See also
 Timeline of historic inventions

References

Citations

Sources 

 

Game design
Application-specific graphs